The Dudley-Hewitt Cup is a championship ice hockey trophy awarded to the Central Canadian Junior A champion. The trophy is currently decided by round robin tournament format, at the conclusion of the playoffs of the Ontario Junior Hockey League, Northern Ontario Junior Hockey League, and Superior International Junior Hockey League, to determine the central representative at the Centennial Cup, the national Junior A championship.

The current format includes the champions of the OJHL, NOJHL, and SIJHL and a pre-selected host city, but in the past has included the champions of the Central Canada Hockey League, Quebec Junior Hockey League, and even the champion of the Callaghan Cup.

The trophy is named after George Dudley and W. A. Hewitt, who served as administrators for the Ontario Hockey Association and are inductees of the Hockey Hall of Fame.

History
The trophy was first awarded in 1971.

From 1984 until 1995, the Thunder Bay Flyers of the United States Hockey League competed for the Dudley Hewitt Cup, winning four titles in 12 years.

The 2002 Dudley-Hewitt Cup marked a new chapter in Ontario hockey history. Since the mid-1990s, the OPJHL and NOJHL had squared off in a head-to-head series to determine the Central Canadian seed in the Royal Bank Cup. In 2001, a new Thunder Bay-area league, called the Superior International Junior Hockey League, was founded. Late in the 2001–02 season the CJAHL informed all three leagues that instead of a series, the Dudley would be contested through a round-robin format. Initially, both the OPJHL and NOJHL threatened to boycott the DHC. The CJAHL announced that if the OPJHL and NOJHL did not send a champion, the SIJHL champion would move on by default to the national championship. The OPJHL did not budge, but the NOJHL gave in and in January announced that their champion would play the SIJHL champion for the DHC in a best-of-three series.

The 2014 Dudley Hewitt Cup saw its fourth all-OJHL Dudley-Hewitt Cup final between the Wellington Dukes and the Toronto Lakeshore Patriots. Toronto won 2–1 advancing to the Royal Bank Cup in Vernon, British Columbia.

The City of Sudbury and the Sudbury Nickel Barons were awarded the 2016 Dudley-Hewitt Cup, but in the spring of 2015 the city withdrew as a result of the Sudbury Nickel Barons moving to Rayside-Balfour. The tournament was awarded to Kirkland Lake, Ontario, and the Kirkland Lake Gold Miners. 

The 2017 Dudley-Hewitt Cup was awarded to Trenton - the same year the Royal Bank Cup was being hosted by the OJHL's Cobourg Cougars. The Trenton Golden Hawks became the ninth different OJHL team to win the Dudley-Hewitt Cup since 2003. The Aurora Tigers (2004 and 2007), Oakville Blades (2008 and 2010), and the Wellington Dukes (2003 and 2011) won the tournament twice. As of 2016, the Soo Thunderbirds appeared in their sixth tournament since 2004.

Dryden, Ontario, and the Dryden Ice Dogs of the Superior International Junior Hockey League were hosts of the 2018 Dudley Hewitt Cup.

The 2019 edition of the Dudley Hewitt Cup was hosted in Cochrane, Ontario, of the NOJHL, after the Cochrane Crunch and the Timmins Rock were the only teams to submit bids.

In early January 2019, the Wellington Dukes were awarded the 2020 Dudley-Hewitt Cup tournament, but shortly afterwards, Hockey Canada levied sanctions against the OJHL for trades made after the January 10 deadline. The OJHL was fined $50,000 and were banned from hosting the Dudley-Hewitt Cup and Royal Bank Cup tournaments for a period of five years. The 2020 tournament was then awarded to Fort Frances, Ontario, before it was cancelled entirely due to the coronavirus pandemic.

American-based team participation 
In 1971, the Detroit Jr. Red Wings of the Southern Ontario Junior A Hockey League lost the inaugural championship in six games to the Charlottetown Islanders.

In 1973, the St. Paul Vulcans of the Can-Am Junior Hockey League were mowed down by the Pembroke Lumber Kings in the Central semi-final.

In 2007, the Soo Indians of the Northern Ontario Junior Hockey League finished last in the round robin. At that point, no American team had made it to either the Centennial Cup or Royal Bank Cup round robin or final series.  This changed on May 4, 2013 when the SIJHL's Minnesota Wilderness defeated the OJHL's St. Michael's Buzzers 4–3 in overtime to win the Dudley and gain entry into the 2013 Royal Bank Cup. Beforehand, the City of Sudbury and the Sudbury Cubs were slated to host the 2013 tournament, but was soon allocated to the City of North Bay and the North Bay Trappers because the Cubs owners backed out.

The 2011 Dudley Hewitt Cup made history as for the first time at the interleague level, more than one American team would be in direct contention for the Central Canadian crown. Wisconsin Wilderness represented the Superior International Junior Hockey League while the Soo Eagles represented the Northern Ontario Junior Hockey League. Wellington Dukes defeated host Huntsville Otters in the final.

Format
Hosts from the OJHL, NOJHL and SIJHL go through a selection process with teams and centres bidding for the rights to host.

Copeland-NcNamara Trophy champions of the Northern Ontario Junior Hockey League, Salonen Cup champion from the Superior International Junior Hockey League and Buckland Cup winners of the Ontario Junior Hockey League compete in a round robin hosted by a predetermined host team and city to determine the Central Canadian champion.

The winner of the Dudley-Hewitt Cup moves on to compete for the Centennial Cup Junior A national championship.

Champions

Notes

References

External links
Dudley Hewitt Cup website

Ice hockey tournaments in Canada
Ontario Provincial Junior A Hockey League
Canadian Junior Hockey League trophies and awards